Naviculavolva is a genus of sea snails, marine gastropod mollusks in the subfamily Simniinae  of the family Ovulidae.

Species
Species within the genus Naviculavolva include:
 Naviculavolva debelius Lorenz & Fehse, 2011
 Naviculavolva deflexa (G.B. Sowerby II, 1848)
 Naviculavolva elegans Fehse, 2009
 Naviculavolva kurziana (Cate, 1976)
 Naviculavolva malaita (Cate, 1976)
 Naviculavolva massierorum (Fehse, 1999)

References

 Lorenz F. & Fehse D. (2009) The living Ovulidae. A manual of the families of allied cowries: Ovulidae, Pediculariidae and Eocypraeidae. Hackenheim: Conchbooks.
 Lorenz, F. & Fehse, D., (2011) Three new species of Ovulidae from the Red Sea (Mollusca: Gastropoda). Conchylia 41(2): 10-23
 Dolin L. & Dockery III D.T. (2018). The Cypraeidae and Ovulidae (Mollusca: Caenogastropoda) from the Cook Mountain Formation (Bartonian, Middle Eocene) of the Gulf coastal plain, southern United States: A province of unsuspected generic origins. Southeastern Geology. 53(1): 41-61.

External links

Ovulidae